Chapadmalal compound is an official retreat of the President of Argentina. It is located on the southern coast of Mar del Plata, in the Buenos Aires Province, and serves as a summer residence. It has a hotel complex nearby. 

The compound was built in 1947, during the presidency of Juan Perón. Raúl Alfonsín only used it on limited occasions. Carlos Menem ordered several improvements, such as a fishing wharf, a higher pool and a shrine. Fernando de la Rúa used it for interviews. During the 2001 Argentine crisis, Adolfo Rodríguez Saá called a summit of governors to it, which was attended by only five; this lack of support led to his resignation. Néstor and Cristina Kirchner did not use it, only their sons visited it on occasions. Mauricio Macri used it for a meeting of his cabinet in a less formal environment.

References

Houses completed in 1947
Official residences in Argentina
Buildings and structures in Mar del Plata
1947 establishments in Argentina